Schwartziella peregrina is a species of minute sea snail, a marine gastropod mollusk or micromollusk in the family Zebinidae.

Description
The very slender shell attains a height between 5.2 mm and 6.6 mm. The protoconch contains 1.5 whorl and the teleoconch ca. 7.5 whorls. The protoconch is smooth. The teleoconch shows strong, opisthocline, slightly flexuous axial ribs (ca. 14 on the penultimate whorl), equivalent in size to the interspaces; and a complex spiral microsculpture of longitudinal slots which are offset along the growth lines. The outer lip is opisthocline, strongly thickened externally, inside smooth, with a sharp edge. The inner lip is slightly thickened and appressed. This species differs from several West African species of Schwartziella in being much more slender than any of them.

Distribution
This species occurs off the Great Meteor Seamount in the Northeast Atlantic Ocean.

References

peregrina
Gastropods described in 2007
Molluscs of the Atlantic Ocean